This is a list of the works in the Accademia Carrara of  Bergamo, with  artists and works from before the 20th century featured in the painting gallery (Italian: Pinacoteca) of the museum.

Painters with surnames A through C

Painters with surnames D-L

Painters with surnames M through R

Painters with surnames S-Z

Notes

 Accademia Carrara on website of Lombardia Beni Culturali

Carrara
Carrera
Accademia Carrara di Belle Arti di Bergamo